The Jammed Lovely Stakes is a Canadian Thoroughbred horse race run annually in mid November* at Woodbine Racetrack in Toronto, Ontario, Restricted to three-Year-Old fillies foaled in the Province of Ontario, it is contested on Polytrack synthetic dirt at a distance of seven furlongs.

Inaugurated at Toronto's now defunct Greenwood Raceway, it was raced there through 1993 after which it was moved to the Woodbine facility. The race was named for the filly, Jammed Lovely, a Canadian Horse Racing Hall of Fame inductee.

The race is now run earlier on the calendar. In 2016 it ran in the first week of September.

The race was run in two divisions in 1991.

Records
Speed record: 
 1:21.75 - Ginger Brew (2008)

Most wins by an owner:
 3 - Sam-Son Farm (1985, 1988, 2006)

Most wins by a jockey:
 4 - Sandy Hawley (1988, 1990, 1992, 1996)
 4 - Todd Kabel (1994, 2004, 2005, 2006)

Most wins by a trainer:
 4 - Roger Attfield (1983, 1993, 2001, 2016, 2017)

Winners

References
 The 2009 Jammed Lovely Stakes at Woodbine Entertainment

Restricted stakes races in Canada
Flat horse races for three-year-old fillies
Woodbine Racetrack
Recurring sporting events established in 1981